Dmitriy Danilenko (born 29 May 1995) is a Russian fencer. He competed in the men's team sabre event at the 2020 Summer Olympics.

References

External links
 

1995 births
Living people
Russian male fencers
Olympic fencers of Russia
Fencers at the 2020 Summer Olympics
Sportspeople from Moscow
Medalists at the 2015 Summer Universiade
Universiade silver medalists for Russia
21st-century Russian people